Crystal Slope is a western slope at about  between Camp Slope and Robot Gully, leading down from the summit crater rim of Mount Erebus, Ross Island. It was so named because the slope includes a talus of large anorthoclase feldspar crystals.

References
 

Landforms of Ross Island